The Gaj class offshore tugboats are a series of two auxiliary watercraft built by Garden Reach Shipbuilders & Engineers Ltd., Kolkata, for the Indian Navy. The vessels in the class are Indian Navy's biggest tugboats and can be used for towing aircraft carriers.

Description
Each vessel in the class has a 40-ton bollard pull and are powered by twin Garden Reach G7V diesel engines coupled to two propellers with a total output of 3920 bhp. They have four foam monitors installed for firefighting operations. The vessels have a speed of 15 knots and are also fitted with diving and salvage equipment. They carry an RCC (recompression chamber) and can render limited submarine rescue services.

Ships in the class

See also
 Tugboats of the Indian Navy

References

Ships of the Indian Navy
Auxiliary ships of the Indian Navy
Tugs of the Indian Navy
Auxiliary tugboat classes